Varadis Palace is the former residence of Prince Tisavarakumarn, the Prince Damrong Rajanubhab on Lan Luang Road in Bangkok, Thailand. The palace was built in 1911 by German architect Karl Döhring during the reign of King Rama V to the reign of King Rama VI. After Prince Tisavarakumarn died at this palace on 1 December 1943, the palace was preserved by his heir Mom Rajawongse Sangkadis Diskul, former Ambassador to Malaysia, Switzerland and the Vatican and presently by his great grandson,  Mom Luang Panadda Diskul, former Provincial Governor of Nakhon Pathom and Chiang Mai and a member of the House of Senate.

In 1977 the palace building was renovated and converted into a museum and library. Princess Galyani Vadhana, the elder sister of Thailand's King Bhumibol, presided over the opening ceremony on 12 September 1977. The palace was awarded outstanding conservation building by The Association of Siamese Architects in 1984.

External links
Bangkok Library on Varadis Palace Museum and Library
tour-bangkok-legacies.com on Varadis Palace

References

Museums in Bangkok
Former royal residences in Bangkok
Historic house museums in Thailand
Residential buildings completed in 1911
Museums established in 1996
1996 establishments in Thailand
Art Nouveau architecture in Thailand
Registered ancient monuments in Bangkok